
The following is a list of Playboy Playmates of 1998.  Playboy magazine names their Playmate of the Month each month throughout the year.

January

Heather Kozar (born May 4, 1976) is an American model known as Playboy's Playmate of the Month for January 1998. She appeared on the cover of the June 1999 issue of the magazine, and was voted Playmate of the Year for 1999.  Her original centerfold was photographed by Richard Fegley. She was also the St Pauli Girl for 2002.

February

Julia Schultz (born June 15, 1979) is an American model and actress. She is the Playmate of the Month for February 1998. Prior to that she was also a Perfect 10 model. She has also had several minor roles in films. She married major league baseball player Brett Tomko in November 2003.

March

Marliece Andrada (born August 22, 1972) is Playboys Playmate of the Month for March 1998 and has appeared in numerous Playboy videos. She joined the cast of Baywatch in the 1997 season; her pictorial was partially shot on the show's location.

April

Holly Joan Hart (born November 10, 1976, in Fort Hood, Texas) is Playboy magazine's Playmate of the Month for April 1998. She has also appeared in a number of Playboy videos.

May

Deanna Brooks (born Deanna Wilson on April 30, 1974, in Boulder City, Nevada) is an American glamour model and actress who is Playboy magazine's Playmate of the Month for May, 1998. She was a bank teller for Key Bank before her Playboy appearance. She was also photographed by celebrity photographer William Shatner for the Cyber Club in 2004.

June

María Luisa Gil (born December 16, 1977) is a Cuban model and actress. She was chosen as Playboys Playmate of the Month in June, 1998.

July

Lisa Dergan (born August 10, 1970, in Corpus Christi, Texas) is an American model, actress, media personality and sportscaster. She is Playboy's Playmate of the Month for July 1998.

August

Angela Little (born July 22, 1972) is an American model and actress. She is Playboys Playmate of the Month for August 1998, and she has appeared in several Playboy videos and special editions, working steadily for Playboy for more than five years following her centerfold appearance.

September

Vanessa Gleason (born August 31, 1979; San Diego, California) is an American model and actress. She is Playboy Playmate of the Month for September 1998.

October

Laura Cover (born May 6, 1977, in Bucyrus, Ohio) is an American model and actress. She is Playboys Playmate of the Month for October 1998, and has appeared in numerous Playboy videos.  Her centerfold was photographed by Arny Freytag. She is married to New York Yankees manager Aaron Boone.

November

Tiffany Taylor (born July 17, 1977) is an American nude model, best known for her many appearances in Playboy. She was Playboys Playmate of the Month for November 1998.

She should not be confused with pornographic actress Tiffany Taylor.

She had a small part in the third season of the HBO series True Blood in the episode "Everything is Broken" playing a human feeder for the Vampire League spokesperson.

In 2019, she played a peripheral role in a murder case involving a businessman in Irvine, California. The murderer falsely used Taylor's name, photo, and likeness and claimed that his victim had eloped with her.

December

Nicole, Erica, and Jaclyn Dahm (born in that order on December 12, 1977, in Minneapolis, United States) are identical triplets. They are the Playmates in the December 1998 issue of Playboy magazine. According to an interview in their video centerfold, Nicole and Erica have tiny black ink dots (one and two dots, respectively) tattooed onto their buttocks, which their parents used to distinguish  the three girls when they were babies.

They are the second set of triplets to be featured in the United States edition of Playboy, after "The Trio from Rio, The Amazing Brazilian Triplets" who were featured in the November 1993 issue. The Dahm sisters were featured in several issues of Playboy, but only appeared on one cover, that of Playboy Australia for June 1999.

See also
 List of people in Playboy 1990–1999

References

1998-related lists
1998
Playmates Of 1998